Indian Heights, Wisconsin may refer to:
Indian Heights, Dane County, Wisconsin, an unincorporated community
Indian Heights, Juneau County, Wisconsin, an unincorporated community